John Gmeiner (5 December 1847, Bärnau, Bavaria - 17 February 1915, Richfield, Minnesota) was a United States Roman Catholic clergyman.

Biography
He studied at St. Francis Seminary, Milwaukee, Wisconsin, was ordained priest in 1870, was professor in the seminary, and later in St. Thomas Seminary, Saint Paul, Minnesota. In 1899 he became rector of St. Francis' Church, Buffalo, Minnesota, and from 1902 until his death was rector of St. Raphael's Church, Springfield, Minnesota.
In 1893 he addressed the World's Parliament of Religions at Chicago on "The Primitive and Prospective Religious Unity of Mankind".

Gmeiner was advocate of theistic evolution.

Works

His publications include:

Modern Scientific Views and Christian Doctrines Compared (1884)
Emmanuel: the Saviour of the World (1888)
Mediæval and Modern Cosmology (1891)

Notes

References

1847 births
1915 deaths
American Roman Catholic priests
German emigrants to the United States
People from Springfield, Minnesota
People from Tirschenreuth (district)
Theistic evolutionists
Catholics from Minnesota